Jacques François Mouret (1780–1837) was a French chess master of the early 19th century who became chess tutor of the future Louis Philippe I and was one of the most successful operators of The Turk, a famous chess-playing automaton.

Brief biography
Mouret was a great-nephew of Philidor and learned the game of chess at the Café de la Régence by Bernard and Carlier, students of Philidor. He was a pupil of Alexandre Deschapelles and later he became a teacher of La Bourdonnais. He also gave chess lessons to the children of the French King Louis Philippe I.
In 1819, he was the operator of The Turk during its tour in England and probably the person, who sold the secret of The Turk to the press.

Although talented, Mouret's personality was affected by alcoholism. Alphonse Delannoy, editor in 1842 of the chess periodical Le Palamède, wrote that "He was a clever fellow, sharp, gay, lively,amusing, and had studied seriously the theory of chess, by which he made his living. His talent redeemed a little the rudeness of his manner and a certain licentiousness which he indulged in. He used to be in a continual state of semi-intoxication", and George Walker  wrote that "His brain was consumed in the Brandy".

In 1836 a book The Treaty Elementary Game of Chess, appeared which is often attributed to Mouret on the basis of the preface, but it seems that he was only the "corrector" as evidenced by an advertisement found in a newspaper after his death.

He ended his life in a state of severe physical and mental deterioration, without a penny to his name. Early in 1837 Le Palamède published an invitation to help the old chess master, but with the following issue the journal published his obituary. The members of the Chess Club of Paris took charge of his funeral expenses.

Mouret and The Turk

Mouret is best known as a hidden operator of Automaton Chess Player known as The Turk, a fake chess-playing machine constructed in the late 18th century and traveled around Europe in the early 19th century. The Automaton, manufactured by Kempelen was shown for the first time to the Austrian court in 1769. After the death of Kempelen in 1805 it came in possession of the German engineer Johann Maelzel who exploited first in Europe and then from 1826 in the USA. Mouret was one of many strong players who played hidden in the Turk (others being Johann Baptist Allgaier, who defeated Napoleon in 1809, Schlumberger, Boncourt and Lewis). Fifty games of the Turk during his exhibition in London in 1819, while the machine was operated by Mouret, are collected in a book published in 1820.  The preface states that to February 1820 (date of publication of the book), The Turk had played about 300 games giving the advantage of pawn and move to his opponents and he only has ever lost six.

Mouret's weakness for drinking often left him penniless and, to survive, he probably revealed in 1834 to Le Magasin picturesque the secret of the Turk. The article, titled An attempt to analyze the automaton chess-player of M. Kempelen, explained how an ordinary-sized man could play a chess game inside the Turk. It was published anonymously, but many references (e.g. Walker) indicate Mouret as the source. The French master was sick and short of money at the time, and died penniless three years later.

"Inventor" of the French Defense?

Mouret cannot be considered the inventor of the response 1...e6 to 1.e4, today known as French Defense, which had appeared in early manuscripts of the game like those of Gioacchino Greco (published for the first time in London by Herry Herringman in 1656 under the title: The Royall Game of Chesse-Play). Mouret, however, advocated and frequently played this defense, very little used at the time, and he played a fundamental role in the events that led to its being named the French Defense. Mouret, in fact, taught the defense to a frequent player of Café de la Régence, Mr. Chamouillet, in exchange for a piece of advice about the purchase of a mirror (as Chamouillet was a glazier). In 1834 Chamouillet was in the committee of Paris at the famous game by correspondence between London and Paris, and he convinced the Paris team to adopt the defense advocated by Mouret (the game can be seen at chessgames.com). Following the victory of the French team, the opening quickly became known as the French Defense, in answer to 1.e4 as popular as 1 ... e5.

Anecdotes

Because of his chronic shortage of money and dependence on alcohol, a variety of stories came out around the character of Mouret. We present here a few that give us a portrait of both Mouret and the chess-life of the time.

The first story concerns the period when Mouret was the hidden operator of The Turk. Initially, Maelzel (the owner of the Turk) and Mouret went on in perfect harmony.  After a certain time, however, Maelzel remained debtor to his assistant for a considerable sum and after a year he still had not paid this debt to Mouret. One day, when the Automaton was in Amsterdam, invited by the King of Holland, Maelzel found Mouret in bed seized with a convulsive trembling. Maelzel was worried since the day after they had to meet the King and asked "Is there no means of subduing this fever?". "Yes, one only". "What is it?". "To pay me the 1500 francs you owe me". Maelzel paid his debts and the cure was wonderful; the Automaton played better than ever.

The second anecdote (too long to be reported here), concerns a "scam" organized by Mouret and De Labourdonnais against a wealthy but miser habitué of the Café de la Régence. The complete text of this story can be found on Google Books.

Style of play and games

Of Mouret's playing style, Le Palamède stated:

Son jeu était très correct et d'une très grande force, principalement sous le rapport de la défense. ("His game was very correct and of tremendous strength, especially in respect to the defense.")

The large majority of Mouret's surviving games are those played by the Turk and collected by Hunnemann. In these games, according to Walker:

"Mouret shows a strong and effective style... These games contain a fair specimen of Mouret's great skill, and embody some beautiful emanations of genius. Throughout the whole, he gives the pawn and move, numbering among his opponents Messrs. Brand, Cochrane, Keen, and Mercier, some of the first chess-players of the time."

The analysis of those games, however, reveals that the large majority of them were won by Mouret on the basis of simple tactical mistakes or even blunders by his opponents (also those called by Walker "some of the first chess-players of the time").

The following game is a typical example.

Brandreth - Chess Automaton (Mouret)

London 1819 (remove black's pawn in f7)

1. e4 e6 2. d4 g6 3. Nf3 d5 4. e5 c5 5. c3 Nc6 6. Bb5 Qb6 7. Bxc6+ bxc6 8. O-O cxd4 9. cxd4 c5 10. Nc3 cxd4 11. Nxd4 Bd7 12. Qd3 a6 13. Rb1 Bg7 14. f4 Nh6 15. Kh1 O-O 16. h3 Qd8 17. Nb3 Nf5 18. Ne2? Bb5 19. Qd1 Bxe2 0-1

Analysis assisted by the chess engine Firebird 1.2  shows that White could have played much better at his 12th move with 12. Nxd5 exd5 13.e6 and if 13... Bc6 14. Nxc6 Qxc6 15. Qd4. Mouret seems to have a “blind spot” for this tactical pattern (sacrifice in d5 followed by e5-e6), which could have occurred in various games played by the Turk. One example is only Mouret's loss against Cochrane (the overall score was +3 =1 -1 in favour of Mouret) and available on chessgames.com.

In the majority of cases, however, Mouret's opponent did not take advantage of this possibility. In Diagram 1, for instance, the position of another game Cochrane – Mouret, London 1819, after Black's 15th move is reported. White played 16. a3 and the game ended in a draw, but he could have gained a better position after 16. Nxd5 exd5 17. e6 (FireBird 1.2).

The most remarkable aspect of these games, however, is Mouret's treatment of the pawn structure similar to that derived from today's Advance Variation of the French Defence, which the Automaton approached in a fashion very close to the modern standards.
A good example can be found in the following example.

Cochrane - Chess Automaton (Mouret)

London 1819 (remove black's pawn in f7)

1. e4 e6 2. d4 c6 3. f4 d5 4. e5 c5 5. c3 Nc6 6. Bb5 Today, this plan is known to be inaccurate, but it was played frequently by the Automaton opponents 6...Qb6 7. Bxc6+ bxc6 8. Nf3 Ba6 9. Kf2 in another game, after the better (according to FireBird 1.2) 9. Ng5, Mouret answered calmly with 9... Bc8 (Tremaine - Mouret, London 1819) 9... cxd4 10. Nxd4 c5 11. Nf3 Nh6 12. h3 Be7 13. g4 O-O 14. Qb3 Qc6 15. Kg3 Rae8 16. Qd1 Nf7 17. h4 Bd8 18. Qc2 Bb7 and FireBird 1.2 evaluates that Black's position widely compensate the pawn. After 19. Ng5  White initiative on the kingside was rebutted with 19... Bxg5 20. hxg5 g6 21. Qh2 h6 22. gxh6 and now Mouret could have obtained a good advantage with 22...d4! (FireBird 1.2), he played instead the somewhat inferior 22... Kh7 and won in a few moves after a blunder of his opponent.

The most known game of Mouret, however, is a loss played (together with Boncourt) against De Labourdonnais. It is an Evans Gambit of a certain theoretical interest for the time, which was reported both in Le Palamède and the Chess Player's Chronicle and was quoted by the 7th edition of the Handbuch des Schachspiels.

References

External links
 HERITAGE des ECHECS FRANCAIS (in French)
 Additional games of Mouret (or The Turk operated by Mouret) at chessgames.com ,,,

1787 births
1837 deaths
French chess players